Jacques Dynam (30 December 1923 – 12 November 2004) was a French film actor. He appeared in more than 150 films between 1942 and 2004, among which the Fantomas saga.

Selected filmography

 La symphonie fantastique (1942) - (uncredited)
 The Angel of the Night (1944) - Un étudiant (uncredited)
 Les Petites du quai aux fleurs (1944) - Paulo
 La Boîte aux rêves (1945) - Petit rôle (uncredited)
 Alone in the Night (1945) - Le chasseur
 Lunegarde (1946)
 Les Démons de l'aube (1946) - Gauthier
 The Ideal Couple (1946)
 Fantômas (1947) - Un préparateur
 Le diamant de cent sous (1948) - Georges
 3ème cheminée sur la gauche (1948)
 La figure de proue (1948) - Lomond
 Scandale (1948)
 Toute la famille était là (1948) - Gaston
 Manon (1949) - Un marin (uncredited)
 Doctor Laennec (1949) - Meriadec
 Barry (1949) - Le moine Claudius
 Vient de paraître (1949) - Un journaliste
 Millionaires for One Day (1949) - Michel
 Amour et compagnie (1950) - Le marin
 The Ferret (1950) - Pierre
 Menace de mort (1950) - Pierre
 The Paris Waltz (1950) - Le calife de Ramsoun
 Tuesday's Guest (1950) - Jean Gompers
 Les femmes sont folles (1950) - Le cousin Fernand
 Ma pomme (1950) - Jacques Turpin
 Without Leaving an Address (1951) - Un photographe
 My Seal and Them (1951) - Un livreur
 La passante (1951) - Le poinçonneur
 La vie est un jeu (1951)
 The Night Is My Kingdom (1951) - Jean Gaillard
 Come Down, Someone Wants You (1951) - Gilbert
 My Wife Is Formidable (1951) - Francis Germain
 Duel in Dakar (1951) - Reinard
 Massacre in Lace (1952) - Pablo le Bègue
 The Damned Lovers (1952) - Raoul
 Allô... je t'aime (1952) - Gilbert Pujol
 Judgement of God (1952) - Un soldat (uncredited)
 La Jeune Folle (1952) - Le consommateur
 My Husband Is Marvelous (1952) - L'efféminé
 Les amours finissent à l'aube (1953) - Inspecteur Sennac
 Quay of Blondes (1954) - Dominique
 Mam'zelle Nitouche (1954) - Le premier réserviste (uncredited)
 Le Secret d'Hélène Marimon (1954) - Galdou
 Le collège en folie (1954)
 Cadet Rousselle (1954) - L'aubergiste des Trois Grâces
 Yours Truly, Blake (1954) - Gaston
 Pas de souris dans le business (1955)
 House on the Waterfront (1955) - Le Meur
 L'impossible Monsieur Pipelet (1955) - Monsieur Durand, un futur père
 Madelon (1955) - Le chasseur de chez Maxim's
 Pas de pitié pour les caves (1955) - Jo
 On déménage le colonel (1955) - Clotaire
 La fierecilla domada (1956) - Florindo
 In the Manner of Sherlock Holmes (1956) - Assistant
 Crime and Punishment (1956) - Le client de Madame Horvais (uncredited)
 Que les hommes sont bêtes (1957)
 L'auberge en folie (1957) - Gustave
 Vacances explosives! (1957) - Le camionneur
 La polka des menottes (1957) - Le chauffeur du camion
 C'est une fille de Paname (1957)
 Marchands de filles (1957) - Mister Jean
 Le Souffle du désir (1958) - Jacques
  (1958) - Max
 Prisons de femmes (1958) - Le médecin
 Taxi, Roulotte et Corrida (1958) - Pedro, le premier bandit
 Les Jeux dangereux (1958) - Dédé - le chauffeur
 Le gendarme de Champignol (1959) - Le gendarme Ratinet
 The Count of Monte Cristo (1961)
 Seul... à corps perdu (1963)
 The Bamboo Stroke (1963)
 Carom Shots (1963) - Macheron
 Maigret Sees Red (1963) - Un inspecteur
 Cherchez l'idole (1964) - Le routier
 Comment trouvez-vous ma soeur? (1964)
 Une ravissante idiote (1964) - Le sergent de police
 Une souris chez les hommes (1964) - Le patron du café (uncredited)
 Male Hunt (1964) - Un truand
 Male Companion (1964) - Le père d'Isabelle / Isabelle's Father
 Fantômas (1964) - L'inspecteur Bertrand
 The Sleeping Car Murders (1965) - Un inspecteur
 Quand passent les faisans (1965) - Le chauffeur de Ribero
 Diamonds Are Brittle (1965) - Le commissaire
 Fantômas se déchaîne (1965) - Bertrand
 Le Grand Restaurant (1966) - Un serveur
 Fantômas contre Scotland Yard (1967) - Bertrand
 L'Homme qui valait des milliards (1967) - Loulou
 Les Têtes brûlées (1967) - Sosto
 Les grandes vacances (1967) - Croizac, le livreur de charbon
 Les risques du métier (1967) - L'inspecteur de police Michaux
 A Strange Kind of Colonel (1968) -  Policeman
 Faites donc plaisir aux amis (1969) - Robert Garaudet
 The Little Theatre of Jean Renoir (1970, TV Movie) - Jules, le second mari / The Second Husband (segment "La cireuse électrique")
 Le Soldat Laforêt (1972) - L'homme en exode
 Dany la ravageuse (1972) - Hearse Driver
 Les grands sentiments font les bons gueuletons (1973) - Alphonse Neyrac
 Les Quatre Charlots mousquetaires (1974) - L'aubergiste
 La gueule de l'emploi (1974) - Le second déménageur
 La Grande Nouba (1974) - Le chef de la sécurité
 À nous quatre, Cardinal ! (1974) - L'aubergiste
 French Connection II (1975) - Inspector Genevoix
 The Smurfs and the Magic Flute (1976) - Mortaille (voice)
 Parisian Life (1977) - Prosper
 Ne pleure pas (1978) - Commissaire Duplantier
 The Associate (1979) - Mathivet
 Womanlight (1979) - Le taxi malaimable
 Julien Fontanes, magistrat (1980-1981, TV Series) - Panavier / Léon Boueix
 Qu'est-ce qui fait craquer les filles... (1982) - The hotel janitor
 Le braconnier de Dieu (1983) - Le brigadier
 One Deadly Summer (1983) - Ferraldo - le patron d'une entreprise de transports
 Tranches de vie (1985) - Alex, le restaurateur
 Bonjour l'angoisse (1988) - Patron de café 2
 The Super Mario Bros. Super Show! (1989, TV Series) - (voice)
 Madame Bovary (1991) - L' abbé Bournisien
 Chômeurs mais on s'soigne (1998)
 The Children of the Marshland (1999)
 Le monde de Marty (2000) - Charles Dancourt
 Fanfan la Tulipe (2003) - Chaville
 L'antidote (2005) - Le propriétaire de l'usine de jouets

References

External links

1923 births
2004 deaths
French male film actors
Male actors from Paris
20th-century French male actors